Haiyue station is a metro station on Line 2 of the Shenzhen Metro. It opened on 28 December 2010.

Station layout

Exits

References

External links
 Shenzhen Metro Haiyue Station (Chinese)
 Shenzhen Metro Haiyue Station (English)

Shenzhen Metro stations
Railway stations in Guangdong
Nanshan District, Shenzhen
Railway stations in China opened in 2010